The Aerotechnics Skyhopper-3000 is a German ultralight trike that was designed and produced by Aerotechnics of Brandenburg. Now out of production, when it was available it was supplied complete and ready-to-fly.

The company seems to have been founded about 2010, gone out of business in 2016 and production ended by that time.

Design and development
The Skyhopper-3000 is a nanotrike that was designed to comply with the Fédération Aéronautique Internationale microlight category, the US FAR 103 Ultralight Vehicles rules and the German 120 kg class. The aircraft is German DULV certified.

The design features a cable-braced hang glider-style high-wing, weight-shift controls, a single-seat  open-frame cockpit without a cockpit fairing, tricycle landing gear and a single engine in pusher configuration.

The aircraft is made from titanium tubing, with its double surface wing covered in Dacron sailcloth. Its wing is supported by a single tube-type kingpost and uses an "A" frame weight-shift control bar. The powerplant is an air-cooled, single-cylinder, two-stroke,  Cisco C-Max engine.

A number of different hang glider wings can be fitted to the basic carriage. The carriage and wing can be folded for ground transportation.

The Skyhopper-3000 has also been used for towing hang gliders aloft.

Variants
Skyhopper-3000
Version powered by a single-cylinder,  Cisco C-Max piston engine
Skyhopper-3000E
Electric aircraft version, powered by an electric motor

Specifications (Skyhopper-3000)

References

External links
Official website archives on Archive.org

Skyhopper-3000
2010s German sport aircraft
2010s German ultralight aircraft
Single-engined pusher aircraft
Ultralight trikes